Emina Bektas and Tara Moore were the defending champions but chose not to participate.

Hailey Baptiste and Whitney Osuigwe won the title, defeating Angela Kulikov and Rianna Valdes in the final, 7–6(9–7), 7–5.

Seeds

Draw

Draw

References
Main Draw

Orlando USTA Pro Circuit Event - Doubles